Khalsa Aid, founded in 1999, is a UK based international non profit humanitarian organization providing support to victims of natural and man made disasters around the world. The organization has been acknowledged for providing relief during 2016 London floods, in war-affected Syria in 2015, setting up refugee camps for Rohingyas on Bangladesh-Myanmar border in 2017, helping in rebuilding Kerala after 2018 floods, and feeding NHS workers in the UK and the poor in India during the COVID-19 pandemic.

Key people 

 Ravi Singh (CEO & Founder)
 Amarpreet Singh (India Director)
 Japneet Singh (Treasurer)
 Jindi Singh (Canada Director)
 Omar Singh (USA Director)
 Bal Sandhu (General Secretary)
 Jaswinder Singh (Treasurer)
 Amarjit Singh Bansal (Trustee)
 Tarvinder Singh (Trustee)
 Indy Singh Hothi (Former trustee & Director)

References

External links 
 Official Website

Non-profit organisations based in London
1999 establishments in England